John Condict  Condit (July 8, 1755May 4, 1834) was a United States representative and a United States senator from New Jersey and father of United States Representative Silas Condit.

John Condict was born in Orange in the Province of New Jersey and after attending public schools he then studied medicine. Condict went on to serve as a surgeon in the American Revolutionary War. He became one of the founders and a trustee of the Orange Academy in 1785.

Political history 
Condict was a member of the New Jersey General Assembly from 1788 to 1789, and the New Jersey Legislative Council from 1790 to 1797.

U.S. House of Representatives 
He was elected as a Democratic-Republican to the Sixth and Seventh Congresses (March 4, 1799 to March 4, 1803).

U.S. Senate 
Condict was appointed as a Democratic Republican to the United States Senate to fill the vacancy in the term beginning March 4, 1803, caused by the failure of the legislature to elect. Elected November 3, 1803 to finish the term. Served from September 1, 1803, to March 3, 1809. He was again appointed to the Senate to fill the vacancy caused by the resignation of Aaron Kitchell. Elected November 2, 1809 to finish the term and served from March 21, 1809, to March 3, 1817.

Later positions 
He was elected to the Sixteenth Congress and served from March 4, 1819 to November 4, 1819, when he resigned to accept a Treasury position; appointed assistant collector of the port of New York 1819–1830.

Death and legacy 
Condict died in Orange Township, New Jersey on May 4, 1834, and was interred in the Old Graveyard, Orange, Essex County, New Jersey. He was surgeon in Col. Van Cortland's Battalion (Heard's Brigade, June 29, 1776).

References

External links

John Condit at The Political Graveyard

1755 births
1834 deaths
Members of the New Jersey General Assembly
Members of the New Jersey Legislative Council
United States senators from New Jersey
People from Orange, New Jersey
Democratic-Republican Party United States senators
Democratic-Republican Party members of the United States House of Representatives from New Jersey
People of colonial New Jersey
Continental Army personnel
18th-century American physicians
Burials in New Jersey
School founders